Andressa Alves da Silva (born 10 November 1992), commonly known as Andressa Alves or simply Andressa, is a Brazilian professional footballer who plays as a midfielder for Italian Serie A club AS Roma. She previously played for FC Barcelona of the Spanish Primera División. She won her first cap for the Brazil women's national team in 2012 and has represented her country at multiple World Cups.

Club career

Andressa transferred from Centro Olímpico to Ferroviária in May 2013. In November 2013, Andressa left Ferroviária to sign for 2013 Copa Libertadores Femenina winners São José.

In November 2014, she ended her stay in São José and signed a contract with NWSL team Boston Breakers. Ultimately she never joined the Breakers as she was instead called into Brazil's residency camp for the 2015 FIFA Women's World Cup. During the World Cup, French club Montpellier announced that they had concluded the transfer of Andressa.

Andressa left Montpellier after one season, signing for FC Barcelona in June 2016. She left the Spanish club in 2019. Andressa then moved to Italy and signed for Roma on the 15th July 2019. Her performances for club and country led to her being shortlisted for the FIFPro World 11 award in September 2019. Andressa made her debut for Roma as a wide forward, but was soon re-positioned in deep midfield for the rest of the Serie A 2019–20 season. In her second season with the Italian club, Andressa frequently switched roles between deep midfield and attacking midfield depending on the opponents Roma was facing. She has been relied upon by Roma as one of the chief playmakers in the team, choosing to extend her stay with the club with a new contract in May 2021.

Two days after she signed her contract extension, Andressa would start for Roma in the 2021 Coppa Italia final against AC Milan. Roma won the match on penalties, and Andressa helped Roma win its first major trophy.

International career

After representing Brazil in the 2010 and 2012 editions of the FIFA U-20 Women's World Cup, Andressa made her senior debut at the 2012 Torneio Internacional Cidade de São Paulo de Futebol Feminino.

At the 2014 Copa América Femenina, Andressa scored the second goal in Brazil's 6–0 rout of Argentina. At the 2015 FIFA Women's World Cup, she scored the only goal in Brazil's group match against Spain, which secured her team's place in the second round. After Brazil's subsequent elimination by Australia, she remained in Canada as part of the winning Brazilian team at the 2015 Pan American Games in Toronto.

International goals

Style of play
Barcelona described Andressa as: "a left-footed player who can slot in anywhere on the left-hand side of the park and who is especially attack-minded in her approach to the game". It was also noted that she is versatile enough to play on the right or as a centre-forward. She is relatively experienced for a 23-year-old after playing international football for four seasons.

Andressa uses her ability to shield the ball in possession all over the pitch, appearing in a number of roles for both club and country. She has played as a full-back at the senior level for Brazil and a deep-lying midfield playmaker for the Italian club Roma. Her dribbling ability with the ball makes her elusive when opponents try to close her down, and her ability to pick out the right pass means her teams frequently trust her with playmaking responsibilities in order to keep her side in control of the game. Andressa also shows notable ability when it comes to direct free-kick attempts on goal, as well as calm under pressure from the penalty spot.

Personal life
Andressa is married to Francielle.

References

External links

 
 Profile at Montpellier HSC 
 
 Andressa Alves – 2015 Pan American Games profile

1992 births
Living people
Brazilian women's footballers
Brazil women's international footballers
Associação Desportiva Centro Olímpico players
2015 FIFA Women's World Cup players
Footballers at the 2016 Summer Olympics
Footballers at the 2020 Summer Olympics
Women's association football forwards
Expatriate women's footballers in France
Expatriate women's footballers in Spain
Brazilian expatriate women's footballers
Brazilian expatriate sportspeople in France
Brazilian expatriate sportspeople in Spain
Montpellier HSC (women) players
Footballers at the 2015 Pan American Games
Primera División (women) players
FC Barcelona Femení players
Olympic footballers of Brazil
Division 1 Féminine players
A.S. Roma (women) players
2019 FIFA Women's World Cup players
Pan American Games medalists in football
Pan American Games gold medalists for Brazil
LGBT association football players
Brazilian LGBT sportspeople
Medalists at the 2015 Pan American Games
FIFA Century Club
21st-century Brazilian LGBT people